Alfred Obrey (3 June 1912 – 26 November 1986) was an English former footballer.

Career
Obrey played for Longton before joining Port Vale as an amateur in May 1936, signing as a professional in October of that year. He made his debut in October 1936 and his first game was the first of a thirteen-game unbeaten run for the club, the first nine of which Obrey helped prevent the opposing centre-forwards from scoring any goals. He scored his first senior goal against York City on 13 February 1937, in a 2–1 victory at Bootham Crescent. He finished the 1936–37 season with 33 appearances to his name. He lost his first team place in December 1937, and was limited to 16 Third Division North appearances in 1937–38. He was transferred to Tranmere Rovers in June 1938, who were relegated out of the Second Division in 1938–39. Obrey returned to Port Vale as a guest in September 1939, but left on the conclusion of the 1939–40 season as the club went into abeyance due to the war.

Career statistics
Source:

References

People from Cheadle, Staffordshire
Footballers from Stoke-on-Trent
English footballers
Association football midfielders
Port Vale F.C. players
Tranmere Rovers F.C. players
Port Vale F.C. wartime guest players
English Football League players
1912 births
1986 deaths